Shane W. Davis is an American astrophysicist. He is an assistant professor in the department of astronomy at the University of Virginia. Davis was a senior research associate at the Canadian Institute for Theoretical Astrophysics. He was awarded a Sloan Research Fellowship in 2015.

Education 
Davis completed a B.S. in physics with university honors and was inducted into Phi Beta Kappa and Phi Kappa Phi at Carnegie Mellon University in 2000. He earned a Ph.D. in physics from University of California, Santa Barbara in 2006. His doctoral advisor was Omer Blaes. His dissertation was titled Using black hole x-ray binaries as laboratories for probing accretion disk theory in strong gravity. He was a postdoctoral fellow in the school of natural sciences at the Institute for Advanced Study from September 2006 to August 2010. He was a postdoctoral fellow at the Canadian Institute for Theoretical Astrophysics (CITA) from September 2010 to August 2012.

Career 
Davis was a senior research associate at the Canadian Institute for Theoretical Astrophysics from September 2012 to July 2014. He joined the department of astronomy at University of Virginia in August 2014 as an assistant professor.

Awards and honors 
In 2015, Davis was awarded a Sloan Research Fellowship.

References 

Living people
Year of birth missing (living people)
Place of birth missing (living people)
American astrophysicists
University of California, Santa Barbara alumni
Carnegie Mellon University alumni
Academic staff of the University of Toronto
University of Virginia faculty
21st-century American physicists
21st-century American astronomers
Sloan Research Fellows